Melissa Hayden (born November 13, 1969 in Pacific Palisades, California) is an American actress. Prior to her acting career, she was a longtime member of the California-based song and dance troupe The Young Americans.

She is best known to soap fans for playing the role of Bridget Reardon on Guiding Light from May 21, 1991 to June 18, 1997, in which she spawned some of the show's most-remembered storylines. After she left Guiding Light, Hayden dropped out of the public eye for many years, but in 2009, she reprised her role as Bridget for the ending of the series.

In 1994, Hayden won a Daytime Emmy Award for her role as "Outstanding Younger Actress" on GL. She had also been nominated in the same category in 1993. She also won a Soap Opera Digest Award and a Young Artist Award in 1994 and 1993 respectively for her role as Bridget.

Hayden also played the character of Mouse on General Hospital.

References

1969 births
Living people
American soap opera actresses
People from Pacific Palisades, California
Daytime Emmy Award winners
Daytime Emmy Award for Outstanding Younger Actress in a Drama Series winners
The Young Americans members